Istoriya Slavyanobolgarskaya (Original Cyrillic: Истори́ѧ славѣноболгарскаѧ corrected from Їстори́ѧ славѣноболгарскаѧ) is a book by Bulgarian scholar and clergyman Saint Paisius of Hilendar. Written in 1762, it is considered Saint Paisius of Hilendar's greatest work and one of the most influential pieces of the Bulgarian revival, as well as the first work of Bulgarian historiography.

Although he was based in the Serbian monastery Hilandar, which was inhabited then mostly by Bulgarian monks, Paisius travelled extensively throughout the country and abroad and collected a vast amount of references to compile and write his concise but historically influential version of Bulgarian history. At that time the influx of Serbian monks decreased at the expense of Bulgarians, particularly from Macedonia. From the 17th to the 19th century, Hilandar was predominantly Bulgarian-populated.

History
The book's first manual copy was done by Sophronius of Vratsa in 1765. Structurally, Istoriya Slavyanobolgarskaya consists of two introductions, several chapters that discuss various historic events, a chapter about the "Slavic teachers", the disciples of Cyril and Methodius, a chapter about the Bulgarian saints, and an epilogue.

Although some excerpts appeared in Petar Beron's Tsarstvenik of 1844, Paisii's History was not published in book form until the 1920s, in the edition of Nikola Filipov. There was an adaptation into modern Bulgarian in 1938. Critical editions were prepared in the 1960s, and a Russian translation. A German translation appeared in 1984, and an English version of the Zograph manuscript in 2001.

The first printed edition of the full original text was prepared by Yordan Ivanov and published in 1914 by the Bulgarian Academy of Sciences. Until 1984, the manuscript was stored at the Bulgarian Zograf Monastery in Mount Athos, Greece. During the last years of the Cold War, the Bulgarian Committee for State Security replaced the manuscript with a copy and transferred the original in Bulgaria. In 1998, President Petar Stoyanov returned it to the Zograf Monastery, and in the meantime in 1998 and 2000 the Sofia University Publishing House produced two photo typical editions of Slavic-Bulgarian History, accompanied by translations into modern Bulgarian and English respectively.

The Zografou draft of the Istoriya Slavyanobolgarskaya is depicted on the reverse of the Bulgarian 2 levs banknote, issued in 1999 and 2005.

Significance
The importance of this manuscript is that it contributed to the formation of the Bulgarian national identity. What would follow is known as the Bulgarian National Revival, in which Istoriya Slavyanobolgarskaya played a significant role.

References

External links
  Full original text of "История славянобългарска" including commentary, bibliography, and a biographical note about the author by Yordan Ivanov, published in 1914 by the Bulgarian Academy of Sciences (in Bulgarian)
 Excerpts from Istoriya Slavyanobolgarskaya in modern Bulgarian
 L’Histoire slavo-bulgare de Paisij de Hilendar. Traduction et commentaire  French translation and commentary by Athanase Popov. INALCO, 2004-2005. (retrieved on 24 July 2009).